"Give Peace a Chance" is a 1969 song by John Lennon and the Plastic Ono Band.

Give Peace a Chance may also refer to:
 
"Give Peace a Chance", a song by Leon Russell from Leon Russell, 1970
"Give Peace a Chance" (Grey's Anatomy), an episode of Grey's Anatomy
"Give Peace a Chance" (Trailer Park Boys), an episode of Trailer Park Boys

See also
Give Peas a Chance